The 2005-06 season was FC Dinamo București's 57th season in Liga I. The season started well, with the highlight in recent times for the club. In UEFA Cup, Dinamo thrashed Premier League team Everton 5–1. Dinamo went on to win the tie 5–2. The crisis started in the second part of the season. Manager Ioan Andone was fired by the new Executive President of the club Ioan Becali. Esteban Vigo was brought in, but because of the scandals inside the club Ioan Becali was kicked out and Vigo left the club as well. Dinamo counted on Ion Marin for the first games of the spring that started with a 3–0 loss to Oţelul Galaţi. Florin Marin came and was kept manager for the rest of the season before Mircea Rednic took the job. Dinamo finished the season with a 0–0 draw against Poli Timișoara and finished 3rd to earn a very important UEFA Cup spot at the end of a horrible season.

Also in the 2005–06 season, in the UEFA Cup group phase, Dinamo managed to beat CSKA Moscow (Cup Holders) 1-0 but they missed the European Spring due to a couple of close games lost in the last few seconds. Playing against Olympique de Marseille on Stade Vélodrome and trailing by 2–1 in the last moments of the game Octavian Chihaia launched a ball over Barthez and scored for 2–2 but the referee whistled the end of the game while the ball was in the air and before it entered the goal. Some claim that might have been a unique moment in the history of the European Cup Football.

Results

UEFA Cup 

Qualifying round

Dinamo won 4-3 on aggregate.

First round

Dinamo won 5-2 on aggregate.

Group phase

Squad 

Goalkeepers: Vladimir Gaev (13/0), Adnan Guso (4/0), Cristian Munteanu (14/0), Florin Matache (1/0).

Defenders: Ionuţ Bălan (9/0), Cosmin Bărcăuan (8/0), Tiberiu Curt (7/2), Mariko Daouda (5/0), Daniel Florea (9/0), George Galamaz (18/0), Lucian Goian (4/0), Dorin Mihuţ (11/0), Cosmin Moţi (27/1), Cristian Pulhac (20/0), Ştefan Radu (8/0), Dorin Semeghin (1/0), Gabriel Tamaș (14/1).

Midfielders: Dan Alexa (13/1), Adrian Cristea (15/0), Ştefan Grigorie (28/10), Andrei Mărgăritescu (20/0), Cătălin Munteanu (10/0), Vlad Munteanu (17/2), Florentin Petre (26/2), Mihăiţă Pleşan (12/2), Adrian Ropotan (5/0), Ianis Zicu (27/9).

Forwards: Alexandru Bălţoi (12/4), Florin Bratu (23/6), Octavian Chihaia (3/0), Ionel Dănciulescu (14/2), Liviu Ganea (1/0), Claudiu Niculescu (20/12).

Transfers 

New players: Summer break – Adnan Guso (Universitatea Craiova), Cristian Munteanu (FC Naţional), Cosmin Moţi, Mariko Daouda, Mihăiţă Pleşan, Ilie Iordache, Claudiu Drăgan (all from Universitatea Craiova), Florin Bratu (FC Nantes), Octavian Chihaia (FC Naţional)

Winter break – Cristian Munteanu (AEK Larnaca), Tiberiu Curt (Steaua București), Cosmin Bărcăuan, Daniel Florea (both Shakhtar Donetsk), Dorin Mihuţ (FC Bihor), Dan Alexa (Beijing Hyundai), Cătălin Munteanu (free player), Ionel Dănciulescu (Shandong Luneng)

Adrian Ropotan was promoted from the youth team.

Left team: Summer break – Bogdan Stelea (Akratitos), Cristian Munteanu (AEK Larnaca), Angelo Alistar (Hapoel Petach-Tikva), Ovidiu Burcã (FC Naţional), Alin Ilin (Jiul Petroşani), Claudiu Drãgan (Jiul Petroşani), Tibor Moldovan (Farul Constanţa), Ionut Badea (FC Vaslui), Adrian Mihalcea (Chunnam Dragons), Alexandru Pãcurar (Gloria Bistriţa).

Winter break – Adnan Guso (FC Argeş), Lucian Goian (Ceahlăul), Mariko Daouda (FC Argeş), Gabriel Tamaş (Spartak Moskva), Adrian Iordache (Shinnik Yaroslavl), Mihăiţă Pleşan (Poli Timișoara), Alexandru Bãlţoi (Oţelul Galaţi), Octavian Chihaia (FC Naţional).

External links 
 www.labtof.ro
 www.romaniansoccer.ro
 worldfootball.net

FC Dinamo București seasons
Dinamo Bucuresti